Patty Mullen is an American actress and model known for her starring role in the 1990 film Frankenhooker, as well as for her dual role in the 1987 film Doom Asylum. Mullen has been featured in the magazine Penthouse, and was awarded with the titles of "Penthouse Pet of the Month" in August 1986 and "Pet of the Year" in 1988.

Patty was one of the judges at Clash of the Champions I.

Filmography

Television

References

Sources

External links
 
 
  (defunct, parked)

American film actresses
American television actresses
Female models from New York (state)
Living people
Screen Actors Guild
20th-century American actresses
21st-century American actresses
People from Staten Island
Penthouse Pets of the Year
Models from New York City
Year of birth missing (living people)